William Smyth (January 3, 1824 – September 30, 1870) was a nineteenth-century politician, lawyer and judge from Iowa.

Born in Eden, Ireland, Smyth attended rural schools as a child, completed preparatory studies and immigrated to the United States with his parents in 1838, settling in Pennsylvania. He moved to Iowa in 1844, attended the University of Iowa, studied law and was admitted to the bar in 1847, commencing practice in Marion, Iowa. Smyth served as prosecuting attorney of Linn County, Iowa from 1848 to 1853 and was appointed judge of the district court for the fourth judicial district of Iowa in 1853, serving until 1857. He resumed practicing law and in 1858 served as chairman of the commission to codify and revise the Iowa State laws. During the Civil War, he served as colonel of the 31st Iowa Volunteer Infantry Regiment for two years.

Smyth was elected a Republican to represent Iowa's 2nd congressional district the United States House of Representatives in 1868, serving from March 1869 until his death in Marion, Iowa on September 30, 1870, while running for reelection. He was interred in Oak Shade Cemetery in Marion.

See also
List of United States Congress members who died in office (1790–1899)

References

External links
 Retrieved on 2008-02-15

1824 births
1870 deaths
District attorneys in Iowa
Iowa state court judges
Irish emigrants to the United States (before 1923)
People of Iowa in the American Civil War
Union Army colonels
University of Iowa College of Law alumni
People from Marion, Iowa
Republican Party members of the United States House of Representatives from Iowa
19th-century American politicians
19th-century American judges